Petri is a given name derived from Latin Petrus. It is very common in Finland. Petri may refer to:

Petri Aho, Finnish guitarist
Petri Forsman, Finnish orienteer
Petri Haapimaa (born 1976), Finnish football player
Petri Hawkins-Byrd (born 1957), American television personality
Petri Helin (born 1969), Finnish football player
Petri Hiltunen (born 1967), Finnish cartoonist
Petri Jalava (born 1976), Finnish football player
Petri Järvinen (born 1965), Finnish football player
Petri Kaverma (born 1963), Finnish artist
Petri Keskitalo (born 1967), Finnish decathlete
Petri Kivimäki (born 1978), Finnish guitarist
Petri Koivisto (born 1986), Finnish ice hockey goaltender
Petri Kokko (born 1966), Finnish figure skater
Petri Kokko (born 1969), Finnish speedway rider
Petri Kokko (born 1975), Finnish ice hockey player
Petri Kontiola (born 1984), Finnish ice hockey player
Petri Korte (born 1966), Finnish darts player
Petri Koskinen (born 1983), Finnish ice hockey player
Petri Krohn (born 1960), Finnish political activist
Petri Kuljuntausta (born 1961), Finnish composer
Petri Lammassaari (born 1985), Finnish ice hockey player
Petri Liimatainen (born 1969), Swedish ice hockey player
Petri Lindroos (born 1980), Finnish guitarist
Petri Matikainen (born 1967), Finnish ice hockey coach
Petri Tapio Mattson (born 1973), Finnish violinist
Petri Mór (1863–1945), Hungarian author
Petri Nygård (born 1975), Finnish rap-artist
Petri Oravainen (born 1983), Finnish football player
Petri Pakaslahti (born 1976), Finnish ice hockey player
Petri Pasanen (born 1980), Finnish football player
Petri Purho (born 1983), Finnish rapid game prototyper
Petri Salo (born 1964), Finnish educational researcher
Petri Skriko (born 1962), Finnish ice hockey player
Petri Suvanto (born 1992), Finnish racing driver
Petri Tiainen (born 1966), Finnish football player
Petri Tiili aka Pelle Miljoona (born 1955), Finnish punk rock musician 
Petri Tuomi-Nikula (born 1951), Finnish diplomat
Petri Varis (born 1969), Finnish ice hockey player
Petri Vehanen (born 1977), Finnish ice hockey goaltender
Petri Viljanen (born 1987), Finnish football player and referee
Petri Virtanen (born 1980), Finnish basketball player
Petri Vuorinen (born 1972), Finnish football player
Petri Walli (1969–1995), Finnish guitarist and vocalist
Petri Ylönen (born 1962), Finnish born French ice hockey goaltender

Finnish masculine given names